Saltburn is a long linear coastal village, which is situated on the northern shore of the Cromarty Firth, in Ross-shire, Scottish Highlands, and is in the Scottish council area of Highland.

The village developed in the same manner as Invergordon, in connection with the Royal Naval base.

References 

Populated places in Ross and Cromarty
Invergordon